Kilerów 2-óch is a continuation of Kiler movie, directed in 1997. The film premiered 8 January 1999 in Poland and like the first part it has received financial and critical success.

Plot 
The time flies and Jurek Kiler has already forgotten the fact that he used to work as a taxi driver and that he was suspected of series of murders. He is now a public person, and together with his girlfriend Ewa runs a foundation that successfully raises money from all over the world. He is now a man of a great renown as he injects a substantial sums of money into various public institutions. However, the idyllic life becomes thwarted when two murderers who do their time - Siara and Lipski - do everything to blow him away. One time they hire a world-famous Polish murderer called Szakal, other time a Cuban hireling alleged Kiler's double who, after many attempts, fail to carry out their "responsibilities". The situation becomes even more perplexed when Lipski obtains a pass for his daughter's wedding and gets to know that his daughter Dona falls in love with Kiler whom she wants to marry.

Credited cast 
 Cezary Pazura as  Jurek Kiler and José Arcadio Morales
 Małgorzata Kożuchowska as Ewa Szańska
 Janusz Rewiński as Siara (Siarzewski)
 Jan Englert as Ferdynand Lipski
 Jerzy Stuhr as Ryba
 Katarzyna Figura as Rysia, Siara's Wife
 Jolanta Fraszyńska as Lipski's daughter
 Krzysztof Kiersznowski as Wąski
 Zdzisław Ambroziak as sports commentator

Awards and nominations 
 In 2000, the movie was nominated for the ORZEŁ (Polish Academy Award) for the best achievement in sound editing (Marek Wronko) and the best achievement in editing (Jadwiga Zajicek).

Notes 
 Siara's (Janusz Rewiński) villa in the suburbs of Warsaw is exactly the same building as the residency of Edward Nowak (Janusz Rewiński)  in the Polish serial “Tygrysy Europy”.
 When two Young Wolves are coming into Kiler's flat one can see a movie “Szwadron” that has been directed by Juliusz Machulski .
 In the scene  at the airport Juliusz Machulski is holding a plate with “Barry Sonnenfeld” written on it – the name of a director who was supposed to make an American version of “Kiler”.

Mistakes 
 One can spot a video camera operator in Aldona's glasses.
 When Morales drives up outside Kiler's block of flats he parks his hummer next to a van, whereas when Kiler comes down the car is parked farther.

Notes

See also

External links 
 Kiler-ów 2-óch at filmweb.pl
 

1999 films
1999 comedy films
Films directed by Juliusz Machulski
Polish comedy films
1990s Polish-language films
Films set in Poland
Films set in Warsaw